KSAR (92.3 FM) is a radio station licensed to serve the community of Thayer, Missouri. The station is owned by Bragg Broadcasting Corporation, and airs a full service radio format.

The station was assigned the KSAR call letters by the Federal Communications Commission on March 10, 2000.

References

External links
 Official Website
 FCC Public Inspection File for KSAR
 

SAR
Radio stations established in 2001
2001 establishments in Missouri
Full service radio stations in the United States
Oregon County, Missouri